Mr. Bunt is a three-act children's fantasy play by American poet, painter, playwright Ira Mallory Remsen. It was performed in the summer of 1924, at the Forest Theater in Carmel-by-the-Sea, California. Novelist, and playwright John Northern Hilliard played the role of Danny, a circus clown. It was the first time a play was presented at the Forest Theater with its own music composed for it and directed by the composer Frederick Preston Search with his own orchestra.

Summary 

On his return from Pasadena to Carmel in 1924, Remsen produced the three-act fantasy play entitled Mr. Bunt, about a imaginary playmate, which was produced at the Forest Theater from July 3rd through 5th. It won the $100 award for the best original play submitted in the annual play contest held by the Forest Theater Society. The play was adapted for the outdoor amphitheater in Carmel-by-the-Sea. The play was similar to novelist and playwright J. M. Barrie's Peter Pan. 

Mr. Bunt was planned and written in Remsen’s studio on Dolores Street in downtown Carmel. The manuscript for the play was entitled Mr. Bunt, Concerning The Invisible Playmates Of Our Childhood, and was dedicated to his wife Helen "Yodee" Remsen. 

The Ira Resmen executive committee was established to cover all aspects of the production for the play. This included publicity, casting, music, costumes, makeup, construction, lighting (by local photographer Lewis Josselyn), and stage hands. The play was produced under the direction of Remsen and Blanche Tolmie. 

The setting was an open space in the forest with trees and flowers centered about a maple tree and a hill of yellow buttercups. The changes of scene were affected by a carved Swiss wooden toy with three sides, each side representing a scene. The Greeks called this a periaktos. It was on rollers and easily turned. Side one was a cottage in the woods; side two, the twisted roots of a maple tree and the head of an owl; and side three was the canvas of the circus tent. 

The first act opened with the cottage in the woods, which stood on the right of the stage. Gyem, was the woodsprite, Mr. Bunt, had the title role, with children as fairies. The second act opened with trumpets, circus riders, and other animals. There was a circus band, bareback riders, clowns, freaks, and sideshow artists.

Characters 

In The Cottage In The Wood:
 Rose - Helen Judson
 Dabs - Dale Leidig
 Annie - Valentine M. Porter

In The Circus:
 Jim - Charles King Van Riper
 Lu - Phyllis Blake
 Danny - John Northern Hilliard

In The Maple Tree:
 Owl - Winsor Josselyn
 Gyem - Caryl Jones
 The Sandman - Calvin H. Luther
 Gateman - Paul Flanders
 Buttons - Denman Whitney
 First Fairy - Barbara Lewis
 Second Fairy - Barrian Cator

In Trouble:
 Mrs. Geshisish - Christine Burton
 Mr. Bunt - Scott Douglas
 Faries, Circus troupe

Reviews 

The performance of Mr. Bunt had mixed reviews.

 

An afterword to the manuscript was written by theater producer Maurice Browne.

Adaptations
Remsen's play Mr. Bunt was presented again at the Forest Theater from Friday July 11 through Sunday 13, 1952. It was produced by the Forest Theater Guild and directed by Blanche Tolmie.

See also
 Timeline of Carmel-by-the-Sea, California

References

External links 
 

 Herbert Heron Collection
 Full text of Mr. Bunt on Internet Archive
1924 plays
Plays set in the 1920s
Plays set in California